The Nationwide Championship was a golf tournament on the Senior PGA Tour from 1991 to 2000. It was played in Alpharetta, Georgia, United States, at the Country Club of the South (1991–1994) and at the Golf Club of Georgia (1995–2000).

The purse for the 2000 tournament was US$1,450,000, with $217,500 going to the winner.

Winners
2000 Hale Irwin
1999 Hale Irwin
1998 John Jacobs
1997 Graham Marsh
1996 Jim Colbert
1995 Bob Murphy
1994 Dave Stockton
1993 Lee Trevino
1992 Isao Aoki
1991 Mike Hill

Source:

References

Former PGA Tour Champions events
Golf in Georgia (U.S. state)